"The Fly" is a poem written by the English poet William Blake.  It was published as part of his collection Songs of Experience in 1794.

The poem

Interpretation
Blake printed the poem with the text set in the branches of trees, an image of a nurse and a toddler in the foreground, and a girl with a racket about to hit a shuttlecock in the background. G. S. Morris notes that "the lines 'Till some blind hand / Shall brush my wing' seem to follow the feathered shuttlecock directly into the little girl's racquet".

The poem catches the narrator in an act of thoughtlessness that leads to the contemplation of the act and its implications. The fly suffers from uncontrollable circumstances, just as the narrator does. This humbling simile has caused the narrator to move from thoughtlessness to thought, and, as "thought is life", from death to life, allowing the conclusion, "Then am I / A happy fly / If I live, / Or if I die", a conclusion to which Paul Miner comments: "Brain-death is real death".

Legacy
The Fly was set to music in 1965 by Benjamin Britten as part of his song cycle Songs and Proverbs of William Blake.
It appears also in the song London on the 1987 Tangerine Dream album Tyger which is inspired by poetry of Blake.
Esperanza Spalding recorded this poem on her 2010 album Chamber Music Society.
Cosmo Sheldrake set this poem to music in his 2015 EP Pelicans We.

References

Other sources
William Blake, The Complete Poems, edited Alicia Ostriker, Harmondsworth, England (Penguin, 1977).

External links

 
A comparison of extant copies of The Fly: from the William Blake Archive.
Esperanza Spalding's presentation of the poem (YouTube.)
The Fly. Music composition by Dmitri N. Smirnov (YouTube.)

1794 poems
Songs of Innocence and of Experience
Fictional flies
Insects in art